Honest Lullaby is the nineteenth studio album (and twenty-first overall) by Joan Baez, released in 1979. It would be her final album on CBS Records' Portrait imprint; it also stood as her last studio album issued in the U.S. until the release of her 1987 album, Recently.

The autobiographical title song was written for her son, Gabriel Harris, and was performed on The Muppet Show in 1980. In  addition to her own compositions, the album contained work by Janis Ian and Jackson Browne. "Let Your Love Flow" was originally a 1976 hit for The Bellamy Brothers. In her 1987 memoir, And a Voice to Sing With, Baez speculated that she was likely dropped from CBS due to a political disagreement she'd had with the label's then-president.

Baez dedicated the album to the memory of journalist John L. Wasserman. (Wasserman, who had died the previous February, had written the liner notes to Baez's 1977 compilation, The Best of Joan C. Baez).

Cover photos were taken by famed photographer Yousuf Karsh.

Track listing
"Let Your Love Flow" (Larry E. Williams)
"No Woman No Cry" (Vincent Ford)
"Light a Light" (Janis Ian)
"Song at the End of the Movie" (Pierce Pettis)
"Before the Deluge" (Jackson Browne)
"Honest Lullaby" (Joan Baez)
"Michael" (Joan Baez)
"For Sasha" (Joan Baez)
"For All We Know" (Sam M. Lewis, J. Fred Coots)
"Free at Last" (Baez, George Jackson)

Personnel
Joan Baez - lead vocals, acoustic guitar (5-8)
Larry Byrom - acoustic guitar (1,3,7)
Pete Carr - acoustic guitar (2,4,5,7), electric guitar (3)
Jimmy Johnson - electric guitar (1-3, 4)
Barry Beckett - keyboards (1-3, 5-7,9,10)
David Hood - bass guitar (1-7)
Roger Hawkins - drums (1-3, 5-6)
Hill Abrahams - violin (4)
James Crozier - cello (4)
Charlie McCoy - harmonica (4)
Ava Aldridge - background vocals
George Jackson - background vocals
Lenny LeBlanc - background vocals 
Mac McAnally - background vocals
Cindy Richardson - background vocals
George Soulé - background vocals
Eddie Struzick - background vocals
Marie Tomlinson - background vocals

References
Baez, Joan. 1987. And a Voice to Sing With: A Memoir. Century Hutchinson, London. 

1979 albums
Joan Baez albums
Albums produced by Barry Beckett
Portrait Records albums